Crosne may refer to:

 Crosne, Essonne, a commune in Essonne, France
 Stachys affinis, a species of Chinese betony with edible rhizomes, sometimes referred to as a "crosne," after the French commune, where it was first cultivated in France